Sit Down, Young Stranger is a studio album by the progressive bluegrass band Country Gentlemen, released in 1980.

Track listing

 "Come Sit by the River" (Roehrig)
 "Meet Me on the Other Side" (Linda Stalls)
 "Love and Wealth" (Ira Louvin)
 "The Likes of You" (Randall Hylton)
 "You're the One" 		
 "Darby's Castle" (Kris Kristofferson)
 "Sit Down Young Stranger" (Gordon Lightfoot)
 "It's Just Like Heaven" 		
 "For the First Time" (Matthew Eddy)	
 "South Elm Street" (Rick Allred)
 "Blue Ridge Mountains Turning Green" (Jim Lunsford)
 "The Lonely Dancer" (Coulter)

Personnel
 Charlie Waller - guitar, vocals
 Rick Allred - mandolin, vocals
 Kent Dowell - banjo, vocals
 Bill Yates - bass, vocals
 Mike Auldridge - resonator guitar
 James Bailey - banjo, baritone vocals
 Ronnie Bucke - drums
 Spider Gilliam - drums
 Doyle Lawson - mandolin, lead guitar

References

1980 albums
Sugar Hill Records albums
The Country Gentlemen albums